Piz Corbet (also known as Pizzo Sevino) is a mountain of the Lepontine Alps on the Swiss-Italian border. It is situated between Mesocco and Campodolcino. On its south-eastern side lies the lake Bacino del Truzzo.

References

External links
 Piz Corbet on Hikr

Mountains of the Alps
Alpine three-thousanders
Mountains of Graubünden
Mountains of Lombardy
Italy–Switzerland border
International mountains of Europe
Lepontine Alps
Mountains of Switzerland
Mesocco